Flavio Cannone (born 5 November 1981) is an Italian individual and synchronised trampoline gymnast, representing his nation at international competitions. Cannone participated at the 2004 Summer Olympics, 2008 Summer Olympics and 2012 Summer Olympics. He competed at world championships, including at the 2005, 2007, 2010, 2011, 2014 and 2015 Trampoline World Championships. He participated at the 2015 European Games in Baku.

He took up the sport in 1993.

References

External links
 
 

1981 births
Living people
Place of birth missing (living people)
Gymnasts at the 2004 Summer Olympics
Gymnasts at the 2008 Summer Olympics
Gymnasts at the 2012 Summer Olympics
Olympic gymnasts of Italy
Gymnasts at the 2015 European Games
Gymnasts at the 2019 European Games
European Games competitors for Italy
Competitors at the 2009 World Games